Doug Williams (3 February 1923 – 18 August 2014) was an Australian rules footballer who played for Carlton in the Victorian Football League (VFL).

A wingman from Yallourn, Williams played in Carlton's 1945 and 1947 premierships winning teams.

He captain-coached North Launceston in 1952.

References

External links
 
 

Carlton Football Club players
Carlton Football Club Premiership players
North Launceston Football Club players
North Launceston Football Club coaches
Australian rules footballers from Victoria (Australia)
1923 births
2014 deaths
Morwell Football Club players
Two-time VFL/AFL Premiership players